Solund is a municipality in the county of Vestland, Norway. It is located in the traditional district of Sogn. Solund is the westernmost island municipality in Norway. Holmebåen on the island of Steinsøy is the westernmost point in all of Norway. Most residents of Solund live on the main islands of Sula and Ytre Sula. The administrative centre of Solund is the village of Hardbakke on Sula island. Some other villages in Solund include Kolgrov on Ytre Sula, Hersvikbygda on Sula, and Losnegard on Losna.

The  municipality is the 295th largest by area out of the 356 municipalities in Norway. Solund is the 345th most populous municipality in Norway with a population of 768.

In 2016, the chief of police for Vestlandet formally suggested a reconfiguration of police districts and stations. He proposed that the police station in Solund be closed.

General information

Utvær was established as a municipality in 1858. The two sub-parishes, or sokn, of Solund and Husøy were separated from the Gulen parish (prestegjeld) to form the new municipality and parish of Utvær at that time. The initial population of Utvær was 1,384. On 1 January 1888, the Krakken farm (population: 17) on the extreme northeastern part of Sula island was transferred from Hyllestad Municipality and eight farms in the Hersvikbygda area (population: 317) on northern Sula island were transferred from Askvoll Municipality and they were all added to the municipality of Utvær.

On 1 July 1890, the municipal name of Utvær was changed to Sulen. The spelling was later altered to Solund by royal decree on 16 November 1923. During the 1960s, there were many municipal mergers across Norway due to the work of the Schei Committee. On 1 January 1964, the island of Losna (population: 40) was transferred from Gulen Municipality to Solund.

On 1 January 2020, the municipality became part of the newly created Vestland county after Sogn og Fjordane and Hordaland counties were merged.

Name
The meaning of the name is unknown. In Old Norse times, the sea between Norway and Scotland was called Sólundirhaf which means "the sea (haf) of Solund." The municipality was named Utvær from 1858 until 1 July 1890 when it was changed to Sulen. The spelling was altered to Solund on 16 November 1923.

Coat of arms
The coat of arms were granted on 16 February 1990. The blue and gray arms have a design of five blue diamonds in a row across the central part of the shield. The arms were inspired by the coat of arms of the now-extinct medieval noble family from the island of Losna.

Churches
The Church of Norway has one parish (made up of three churches) within the municipality of Solund. It is part of the Nordhordland prosti (deanery) in the Diocese of Bjørgvin.

Government
All municipalities in Norway, including Solund, are responsible for primary education (through 10th grade), outpatient health services, senior citizen services, unemployment and other social services, zoning, economic development, and municipal roads. The municipality is governed by a municipal council of elected representatives, which in turn elect a mayor.  The municipality falls under the Sogn og Fjordane District Court and the Gulating Court of Appeal.

Municipal council
The municipal council  of Solund is made up of 15 representatives that are elected to four year terms. The party breakdown of the council is as follows:

Mayor
The mayor  of a municipality in Norway is a representative of the majority party of the municipal council who is elected to lead the council. The mayors of Solund (incomplete list):
2015–present: Gunn Åmdal Mongstad (Sp)
2011-2015: Ole Gunnar Krakhellen (H)
2003-2011: Gunn Åmdal Mongstad  (Sp)
1999-2003: Steinar Krakhellen (H)
1991-1999: Vigdis Midtbø (Ap)
1988-1991: Sveinung Kråkås (H)
1981-1987: Reidar Engevik (KrF)
1976-1981: Steinar Krakhellen (H)

Population

Solund is one of the least populated municipalities in all of Norway. The population of Solund is scattered among the islands in small villages as follows:

Hardbakke - 246 inhabitants
Storøy/Dalesund - 139 inhabitants
Nesefjord - 89 inhabitants
Kolgrov/Trovåg - 62 inhabitants
Hjønnevåg - 59 inhabitants
Strand/Oddekalv - 53 inhabitants
Færøy/Leknessund - 52 inhabitants
Hersvikbygda - 42 inhabitants
Austrefjord/Dumbefjord - 26 inhabitants
Indrevær/Utvær - 11 inhabitants
Krakhella - 6 inhabitants
Losnegard - 4 inhabitants

Geography

Solund is a municipality made up of many islands. The two largest islands are Sula and Ytre Sula. Other islands are Losna, Steinsundøyna, Nesøyna, Ospa, Rånøyna, Færøyna, Lågøyna, and Hågøyna. The westernmost point in Norway is Holmebåen in the tiny Utvær islands which are mostly uninhabited. Utvær Lighthouse is located at Utvær.

Solund is bordered to the north by the municipality of Askvoll, to the east by Fjaler and Hyllestad, to the south by Gulen, and to the west by the North Sea. The Sognesjøen strait runs along the southern border of the municipality. It is the main connection between the sea and the large Sognefjorden. The mouth of the Sognefjorden lies just east of Solund.

Economy
Fishing is the most important industry in Solund. Solund Verft is the largest industrial business with 21 employees working on the maintenance, reconstruction, and repair of ships. Solund is popular with boaters with its myriad exciting islands and also attracts numerous tourists looking for outdoor recreation and fishing. Utvær island and the Utvær Lighthouse is a popular destination for tourists during the summer.

Attractions

Gåsvær
Gåsvær is among the outermost islands of northern Solund. It is far west out at sea between the Lågøyfjorden and the Gåsværosen river outlet. The fishing banks are just off the island's coastline, and Gåsvær most probably has a long history of trade. In 1767, the island had both its own guesthouse and pub. Over the past century, the islanders have made their living from fishing and agriculture, and in more modern times, taking passengers over the waters and tourism. The oldest section of the characteristic main house dates back to the 18th century, while another section was built using timber from a shipwrecked sailing ship.

Utvær
One cannot travel any further west in Norway and still be on solid ground. There are no longer any permanent residents on the island of Utvær, but there are always two people on duty at the lighthouse. To visit Utvær one has to travel by boat. There is a service available on request from Kolgrov all year round. In the summer season there is a scheduled service with departures from Hardbakke, Eivindvik, and Korssund.

The County Governor of Vestland declared Utvær to be a nature reserve. This decision applies to the Utvær island group and surrounding sea. An exception is made for the island of Utvær itself and the sea immediately around it. The Norwegian Riksantikvar (preservation of Norwegian heritage) has made a proposal to preserve the lighthouse itself.

In the Middle Ages, Utvær Chapel was located to the south of the existing settlement. It is somewhat uncertain when the chapel was built. The first written references to if appear in the work of Bjørgynar Kalveskinn from 1320. The chapel had an income from gifts and fishing tithes. In the 17th century the chapel owned 15 cows and 27 sheep that were rented out. Later on in the 17th century the chapel of Utvær was robbed by Scottish pirates.

The chapel bell from 1641 is currently exhibited at the Heibergske Samlingar exhibition in Kaupanger. Four sermons a year were held in the chapel and the priest had to come by boat from Eivindvik. He was often stranded on the islands nearer the mainland as a result of bad weather. In 1718 the chapel was moved into the island of Husøy (Husøy Chapel). It was pulled down at the end of the 19th century when Straumen church was inaugurated.

The lighthouse burned down in February 1945 during an allied air attack during World War II. The lighthouse was reconstructed from 1948 to 1952. The lighthouse itself took on a different form from previously and the "balcony" on the top was one storey lower.

Arboretum
The Coastal Arboretum in Hardbakke is a collection of trees and plants of largely indigenous species. There are 60 different species planted there. The rhododendron collection is a sight to behold in early summer. There is also a marked footpath up to the top of Ravnenipa mountain.

Notable people 
 Mimi Sverdrup Lunden (1894 in Sulen – 1955) a Norwegian educator, non-fiction writer and proponent for women's rights
 Einar Sverdrup (1895 in Solund – 1942) a Norwegian mining engineer, killed in action during Operation Fritham
 Paul Vårdal (1925 in Solund – 2010) a Norwegian accountant and a pioneer of accountant education in Norway

References

External links

Municipal fact sheet from Statistics Norway 
Official website: Solund Kommune 
NRK: Fylkesleksikon - Solund Kommune 
Norway’s far-flung isle with a Viking spirit

 
Municipalities of Vestland
1858 establishments in Norway